The following is a list of works about the city of Guangzhou, China.

List of works, arranged chronologically

Published in the 17th-18th century

Published in the 19th century 
 
 
 
 
 
 
 
  (Includes several photos of Canton)
 
 .

Published in the 20th century

Published in the 21st century 

 
 Piper Gaubatz, “Globalization and the Development of New Central Business Districts in Beijing, Shanghai and Guangzhou,” chapter 6 in Restructuring the Chinese City: Changing Society, Economy and Space (New York: Routledge, 2005) 98-121.
 
 
 
  (Article about Africans in Guangzhou)

See also
 Guangzhou history
 Timeline of Guangzhou
 Chinese historiography

Guangzhou
guangzhou
Guangzhou